Wendi Judith Henderson (born 16 July 1971) is an association football player who represented New Zealand at international level.

Henderson made her full Football Ferns debut as a substitute in a 3–0 win over Hawaii on 12 December 1987. She was for a time New Zealand's most capped female player with 64 caps and 16 goals to her credit, before Hayley Moorwood surpassed this total on 19 June 2011.

Henderson represented New Zealand at the Women's World Cup finals in China in 1991, and again in 2007, becoming the first New Zealand player to represent her country in two senior football world cups.

References

External links

1971 births
Living people
New Zealand women's international footballers
New Zealand women's association footballers
1991 FIFA Women's World Cup players
2007 FIFA Women's World Cup players
Women's association football forwards
New Zealand women's national football team managers